The National Mutual Royal Bank (NMRB) was an Australian bank. Founded in February 1986 by National Mutual and the Royal Bank of Canada, it opened with 45 former National Mutual Permanent Building Society branches. In 1986 it took over the United Permanent Building Society. After only four years in existence, The NMRB was sold in March 1990 to the Australia & New Zealand Banking Group, more commonly known as the ANZ Bank.

References

Defunct banks of Australia
Banks established in 1986
Banks disestablished in 1990
Royal Bank of Canada
1986 establishments in Australia
1990 disestablishments in Australia